Boxford is a large village and civil parish in the Babergh district of Suffolk, England. Located around six miles east of Sudbury straddling the River Box and skirted by the Holbrook, in 2005 the parish had a population of 1,270. decreasing to 1,221 at the 2011 Census.

History
According to Eilert Ekwall the meaning of the village name is "the ford where box trees grow". During the Middle Ages, Boxford was a wool town.

Historical writings
In 1870–72, John Marius Wilson's Imperial Gazetteer of England and Wales described the village as:

In 1887, John Bartholomew also wrote an entry on Boxford in the Gazetteer of the British Isles with a much shorter description:

Governance
An electoral ward in the same name exists. The population of this ward stretches north to Milden with a total population of 2,170.

International connections
As part of the American Bicentennial celebrations the townspeople of Boxford, Massachusetts, visited the villages of Boxford (there are three) in England during 1975 looking for the source of the name of their own village and decided that Boxford in Suffolk was likely to be where the name of their own town came from.

As a result of this the villagers of Boxford, Suffolk, were invited to Boxford, MA, the following summer. This drew attention from the media: the Evening Standard incorporated a photograph of the villagers in a centre-page spread in one of their November 1975 editions, and a TV crew led by Bernard Falk for the BBC Nationwide programme accompanied the villagers when they left for a two-week stay on 23 July 1976. A TWA Boeing 707 was hired which flew the villagers from London Heathrow to Boston Logan, from where they were bussed to Boxford, MA, and dispersed amongst receiving families.

Economy
There are two pubs in Boxford: The Fleece, (a 16th-century grade II* listed coaching inn) and the White Hart.

Riddelsdell Brothers was established here in 1900 and is believed to be Europe's oldest recorded working garage.

Copella fruit juices are made at orchards at Hill Farm on the outskirts of Boxford.

Geography

Localities
Intrinsic to the parish of Boxford are 3 hamlets, Stone Street south of the church and the A1071 and that to the east as Calais Street, neither separated by buffer zones of more than 250 metres and well connected by pavements/footpaths as well as roads. Hagmore Green is south west of Stone Street.

Notable people
Robert Coe (1596–1689), early settler of New England.
John Kingsbury (?–1660), a representative of Dedham, Massachusetts to the Great and General Court in 1647, originally from Boxford.
Joseph Kingsbury (1600–1676), early settler and selectman in Dedham, Massachusetts.
Elinor Bellingham-Smith (1906–1988), painter of landscapes and still life.
Hardiman Scott (1920–1999), journalist, broadcaster and writer. He served as the BBC's first political editor, from 1970 to 1975.

References

Location grid

External links

 
Villages in Suffolk
Civil parishes in Suffolk
Babergh District